Chathurika Jayamani Peiris (born 2 January 1981) is an actress in Sri Lankan cinema and television. She is best known for the roles in television serials Sepalika, Swayanjatha and Hiru Thanivela.

Personal life
Her father's elder brother Ariyadasa Peiris is also a veteran radio announcer and artiste of SLBC. Ariyadasa Peiris has two brothers, Jayantha Peiris and Ranjith Peiris and one daughter, Charitha Priyadarshani Peiris. Chathurika's father Jayantha Peiris is also a teledrama producer. Charitha is a popular singer, who is married to fellow veteran singer Edward Jayakody. Charitha and Edward has one son, Chandeepa and one daughter, Sharanya. Ranjith Peiris has two daughters, Niranjala Basnayake and Chamali Vathsala worked at Sri Lanka Rupavahini Corporation, Sri FM and Lakhanda Radio respectively.

Her younger sister, Purnika Pieris is also a teledrama actress and television host working in TV Derana. Poornika was married to Sahan Abeysekera, who is also a television host. Sahan and Purnika have one son, Adithya. The couple separated in 2017. In 2019, Purnika married musician and fellow television host Peshala Manoj.

Chathurika is initially dated with popular actor Roshan Pilapitiya for long time, where they separated in 2014. In 2014, she married fellow actor Gayan Wickramathilake. Gayana and Chathurika owned the garment shop "Bobby House". The couple has one daughter: Aradhana Hansadhwani.

Career
She made her first cinema appearance in 2004 film Aadaraneeya Wassaanaya directed by Senesh Dissanayake Bandara, where she portrayed the main female role.

She won the Best Actress Awards for her leading role in Swayanjatha teledrama (2012) at the 8th Rupavahini State Awards ceremony in 2013. In 2012, she won the award for the Best Teledrama Supporting Actress for the same at Sumathi Tele Awards.

In 2009, she produced the television serial Sihina Kumari. In 2013, she acted in the stage play Mahasamayama.

Selected television serials

 Akuru Maki Na
 Amaya 
 Bindunu Sith
 Gajamuthu
 Gini Weluma 
 Hada Pudasuna 
 Hiru Thanivela
 Hithuwakkarayo
 Indrachapa 
 Isuru Sangramaya
 Karuvala Gedara
 Nethaka Maayavee 
 Paaradeesaya
 Prarthana Mal
 Rajini
 Rangana Vijithaya 
 Samanalayano
 Sathya
 Senehasa Kaviyak
 Sepalika
 Sihina Sithuvam 
 Sihina Kumari
 Sith Bindi Rekha 
 Sooriya Daruwo
 Sulang Kapolla 
 Swayanjatha
 Therani Geethaya 
 Vasanthaya Avilla 
 Yaso Mandira 

 Saheli
  Aathma
 Eka Raane Kurullo
  Sihina Aran Enna

Filmography

Awards and accolades

Presidential Film Awards

|-
|| 2004 ||| Aadaraneeya Wassaanaya || Best Upcoming Actress ||

Sarasaviya Awards

|-
|| 2004 ||| Aadaraneeya Wassaanaya || Best Upcoming Actress ||

Rupavahini State Awards

|-
|| 2012 ||| Swayanjatha || Best Actress ||

Raigam Tele'es

|-
|| 2006 || || Most Popular Actress || 
|-
|| 2007 || || Most Popular Actress || 
|-
|| 2012 || Swayanjatha || Best Actress ||

Sumathi Awards

|-
|| 2006 || || Most Popular Actress || 
|-
|| 2012 || Swayanjatha || Best Supporting Actress ||

References

Sri lanka Beauty Actress Chathurika Peris New

External links 

Chathurika loses Nestomalt power
I am never cheat for girls
පවුල් කැඩුවෙ නෑ - චතුරිකා පීරිස්
චතුරිකා පීරිස් සහ ගයාන් අතිනත ගත් කතාව
චතුරිකා දැන් අම්මා කෙනෙක් වෙලා
Gossips are true - Gayan’s Wife speaks
We refresh our Lifes
ඒකා­කාරී නිසා මට රඟ­පාන්න කම්මැලි හිතුණා

Living people
Sinhalese actresses
Sri Lankan film actresses
21st-century Sri Lankan actresses
1986 births